Presbyterian Christian School (PCS), is a private Christian school in Hattiesburg, Mississippi. It was originally founded as Bay Street Christian Day School in 1976. It serves preschool through grade 12. Grades K5-6 attend one campus, while 7-12 attend an adjacent campus. 

The historian Joseph Crespino has noted that, unlike many other private schools in Mississippi, PCS was established after school desegregation began and enrolled minority students within a few years of its founding.

However Crespino's theory is still debated. At the time the school was founded large numbers of African-American students had begun to fill Hattiesburg public schools and many white parents, outraged at this, began to enroll their students at the newly founded PCS. This reasoning for placing children at PCS still stands today. Many parents enroll their children at PCS because of unfounded and sometimes racist claims about Hattiesburg public schools. Aside from the fact that Hattiesburg public schools have seen great success in recent years even with continued white flight, this bias also ignores the role that continued segregationist actions have played in harming the city schools. PCS minority attendance remains low, with a C rating in diversity. PCS is strongly Conservative and Christian on its teaching and disciplinary levels.

References

External links

 Presbyterian Christian School

Private K-12 schools in Mississippi
Buildings and structures in Hattiesburg, Mississippi
Christian schools in Mississippi
Segregation academies in Mississippi